Khouzh (pronounced as khoxh in the local language) is a village in Pakistan, situated 130 km from Chitral town. It is surrounded by high mountains. The river of Chitral flows along the village to its east. Yarkoon valley and Mastuj are situated at the north and south respectively.It has surface elevation of 2408 meters.

Population and people
Around 2000 people live in the village. The people speak the Chitrali language. The inhabitants settled there many centuries ago. Four major tribes live in the village: Khoshwaqt, Masholaye, Sheghniye, Syed, Qaziye. Apart from these tribes, few people had migrated from Molkhow, Pashk, Bang, and Rach in the mid -20th century.

Education
The literacy rate is almost 70%; the rate is 100% in the young generation, but people above the age of 50 are less educated due to having no special education system at that time. At that time only one primary school was present, but today there are three schools. These are playing their role in educating the people of the area. The Agha Khan school is playing an especially important role in educating girls, that is why the literacy rate among girls is equal to the literacy rate of boys.

Irrigation
The village is irrigated by two main sources of water called Molkhoxanogh, and Dasghargologh. The water volume in Dasgar Gol (stream) is much more as compared to the  Molkhoxan Gol (stream). As a result, the upper Khouzh, which is irrigated by the water of Dasghar Gole is much greener than the lower Khouzh. Most parts of the Lower Khouzh are not irrigated due to lack of water and remain uncultivated.

Personalities
Muhammad Ghyirat Baig (Late) Teacher 
Dana Khan (Late) Social Worker
Mir Haidar Khan (late) Member BD in Ayub regime and Member Judicial Council Chitral 
 Syed Munawar Shah (Late) Mukhi Ismaili Community, Member Judicial Council Chitral, Member BD, visited Bombay(Mumbai) in religious matter of the community.
Ghairat Shah (late) also known as "Lashto Kiftan", Social Activist, Local Contractor 
Noor Haidar Khan (late)
Mir Saheb Baig Religious Scholar (late)
Mohammaed Anwer Baig (late) Teacher, 
Mirza Ghias Baig (Chief Anesthesia Malakand) 
Mir Shaheen Baig (Social Worker)
Aman Ullah Khan (ex. soldier/Goomnam Sepahi) 
Bahadar Ali Khan (Politician, Ex Chairman Union Council Yarkhun (1987-1992), MastuJ, and was elected Member of the village council Khuzh (2015-2020)  
Rahim Aman (social Worker, Ex. member of union council Parkusab 1982-1985)
Rauf Amam (Retired DFC)
Hafiz Aman Advocate Supreme Court 
Asad Ullah Director Ret. Director of Agriculture District Chitral.
Nasir Aman Ret. SO Secretariats Peshawar
Sabir Aman Editor The News International
Nasir Ullah Ret. Librarian at Islamabad 
Mumtaz Ahmed (Govt Finance Area Officer)
Zia ur Rehman Bank Manager
Atta Ur Rehman Civil Judge 
AtiqUr Rehman Advocate
Gul Nadir (late), Retired SHO
Hussain Nadir (Retried ASI Special Branch Peshawar CM House )
Azghar Ali, Retired Head Master
Jamsheed Ali Khan,(Ret. Superintendent at Sawat Education Board)
Zarwali Khan, Peshawar(PRO secretariat)
Siraj Ali Khan, Advocate High Court/Politician, Ex Nazim Union Council, Mastuj 2000-2005
Syed Ahmed Hussain Shah Social Worker, Local Politician
Aziz Ahmad, Social Worker, and was elected Member village council Khuz 2015-to 2020
Ashoor Muhammad Khan, Social Activist
Shahid Ali Mir, Religious Scholar
Rehmat Wali Khan , Social Activist, Sales Manager at State Life Insurance, AKU donor 
Manzoor Elahi, Engineer
Khalil Ahmad, Advocate
Dr. Qayum, MBBS, FCPS
Siraj Uddin, Journalist
 Miraj Ali Khan Businessman and social activist

References 
http://www.ethnologue.com/show_work.asp?id=32850

External links
 Yidgha, A Language of Pakistan

Populated places in Chitral District